Joseph A. Smith (September 23, 1911 – May 25, 2003) was an American politician and law enforcement officer who served as Sheriff  of Worcester County, Massachusetts from 1962 to 1977.

Smith was the son of Dr. Joseph A. and Mary (Dunn) Smith. 

From 1941 to 1962 Smith was an F.B.I. special agent. Smith worked as an instructor teaching such things as firearms and federal criminal law.  

Smith resigned his position as Sheriff on September 1, 1977 while under investigation by the Massachusetts Attorney General.

References

2003 deaths
College of the Holy Cross alumni
Boston University School of Law alumni
Sheriffs of Worcester County, Massachusetts
Federal Bureau of Investigation agents
1911 births
People from Rutland, Massachusetts